Rear Admiral Edward Courtney Boyle, VC (23 March 1883 – 16 December 1967) was a Royal Navy officer and an English recipient of the Victoria Cross, the highest award for gallantry in the face of the enemy that can be awarded to British and Commonwealth forces.

Early life
Boyle was born on 23 March 1883 in Carlisle, Cumberland, and educated at Cheltenham College.

Naval career
Boyle joined the Royal Navy, and HMS Britannia, in 1897. He joined the submarine service in July 1904 when he was sent to the depot ship . He was soon promoted lieutenant and given command of one of the Holland-class submarines.

Boyle was 32 years old, and a lieutenant commander in the Royal Navy during the First World War when the following deed took place for which he was awarded the VC, the citation was gazetted on 21 May 1915:

Its sinking ended Ottoman attempts to reinforce Gallipoli by sea. In addition to Boyle's VC, Edward Geldard Stanley and Acting Lieutenant Reginald Wilfred Lawrence were both awarded the Distinguished Service Cross and all the ratings were awarded the Distinguished Service Medal.

Boyle made at least two more tours into the Sea of Marmara aboard E14 during the Gallipoli Campaign.

Personal life
Boyle married Marjorie Leigh in Marylebone, London in 1912.

Later life
Boyle retired with the rank of rear admiral in 1932, but was recalled to serve in the Second World War. He served as Flag Officer-in-Charge, London, from 1939 to 1942.

In December 1967 Boyle was knocked down by a lorry on a pedestrian crossing and died of his injuries. For the last few years before his death he had resided at the Station Hotel in Sunningdale, near to Sunningdale Golf Club where he golfed several times a week. His accident occurred a hundred yards from his hotel whilst he was crossing the A30.

His Victoria Cross is displayed at the Royal Navy Submarine Museum, Gosport, Hampshire.

References

Bibliography

1883 births
1967 deaths
Military personnel from Cumberland
British Gallipoli campaign recipients of the Victoria Cross
Royal Navy rear admirals
Royal Navy submarine commanders
People educated at Cheltenham College
People from Carlisle, Cumbria
Royal Navy recipients of the Victoria Cross
Royal Navy officers of World War I
Recipients of the Order of Saints Maurice and Lazarus
Recipients of the Legion of Honour
Pedestrian road incident deaths
Road incident deaths in England